Pablo S. Gomez's Inday Bote is a 2015 Philippine fantasy comedy-drama television series based on the local comic book of the same title created by Pablo S. Gomez. Directed by Malu Sevilla and Jon Villarin, it is topbilled by Alex Gonzaga, Alonzo Muhlach, Matteo Guidicelli and Kean Cipriano. The series aired on ABS-CBN's Primetime Bida evening block and worldwide via The Filipino Channel from March 16, 2015 to May 29, 2015, replacing Bagito and was replaced by Pasión de Amor.

The series is streaming online on YouTube.

Cast and characters

Main cast
 Alex Gonzaga as Inday Catacutan / Kristal Delgado
 Alonzo Muhlach as Entoy
 Matteo Guidicelli as Greg Navarro
 Kean Cipriano as Jerome Santiago
 Nikki Valdez as Mimi
 Smokey Manaloto as Teroy
 Nanding Josef as Nilo

Supporting cast
 Aiko Melendez as Fiona Vargas-Navarro
 Alicia Alonzo as Lita Vargas
 Malou Crisologo as Siony Catacutan
 Jeffrey Santos as Mike Navarro
 Izzy Canillo as Anthony "Onyong" Catacutan
 Alora Sasam as Andrea "Andeng" Catacutan
 Tart Carlos as Penelope "Penny" Castro
 Arlene Tolibas as Estelita Santiago/Ramona "Onay" Santiago
 Michael Conan as Roger
 Mico Palanca as Robert
 Jerry O'Hara as Alfredo

Special participation
 Mutya Orquia as young Inday
 Gabrielle Nagayama as baby Inday
 Bryce Viray as young Greg
 Steven Ocampo as young Jerome
 Amy Nobleza as young Andeng
 Isabel Oli as young Lita Vargas
 Carla Humphries as Marice Vargas-Delgado 
 Bobby Andrews as Angelo Delgado
 Biboy Ramirez as Lucas Catacutan

Soundtrack
 Eh Di Wow! - Vice Ganda
 Panaginip Lang - Alex Gonzaga
 Nag-iisa Lang - Angeline Quinto

Production

Cancellation
Inday Bote ended because of its low ratings, unlike its predecessor Bagito that garnered 27.2% on its pilot episode, Inday Bote got only a low score of 18.4%. The network decided to cut the story short and ended on May 29, 2015. Making the show's run for only 2 months and 2 weeks with 53 episodes. It was replaced by Pasión de Amor, the Philippine remake of the Colombian telenovela Pasión de Gavilanes and only got high in the show's ratings — unlike the mentioned above's predecessor — during its eight-month run.

Ratings

See also
List of programs broadcast by ABS-CBN
List of ABS-CBN drama series

References

ABS-CBN drama series
Fantaserye and telefantasya
2015 Philippine television series debuts
2015 Philippine television series endings
Television series by Dreamscape Entertainment Television
Television shows based on comics
Filipino-language television shows
Television shows set in Quezon City